Hipódromo is a barrio (neighbourhood or district) of Melo, the capital of Cerro Largo Department of eastern Uruguay. It derives its name from the Hipódromo de Melo, the horse racing track of the city which it contains.

Geography
This barrio is located on Route 7, west of the city. The stream Arroyo Conventos flows between this barrio and the city.

Population
In 2011 Hipódromo had a population of 505.
 
Source: Instituto Nacional de Estadística de Uruguay

References

External links
INE map of Melo, Hipódromo, Barrio López Benítez and Barrio La Vinchuca

Populated places in the Cerro Largo Department
Horse racing venues in Uruguay
Sport in Cerro Largo Department